Omar Andres Ponce Manzo (born 25 January 1977) is an Ecuadorian football referee. 

Ponce became a FIFA referee in 2009. He has served as a referee for the 2011 FIFA U-17 World Cup and 2014 FIFA World Cup qualifiers.

References

1977 births
Living people
Ecuadorian football referees